Catasauqua, referred to colloquially as Catty, is a borough in Lehigh County, Pennsylvania. Catasauqua's population was 6,518 at the 2020 census. It is a suburb of Allentown in the Lehigh Valley, which had a population of 861,899 and was the 68th most populous metropolitan area in the U.S. as of the 2020 census. In 1839, Catasauqua was the location of the first manufactured anthracite iron in the nation. 

 
The borough was settled in 1805 and chartered in 1853.

Geography
Catasauqua is located at  (40.652995, -75.467627). Nearby large communities include Allentown three miles (5 km) to the south and Bethlehem seven miles (11 km) to the east. Catasauqua Creek flows through the town. Lehigh River runs along the southwestern edge of Catasauqua.

Neighboring municipalities
Hanover Township
North Catasauqua
Whitehall Township
Northampton
Allentown
Allen Township
Bethlehem
Coplay
Hokendauqua

Demographics

As of the census of 2000, there were 6,588 people, 2,616 households, and 1,750 families residing in the borough.  The population density was 5,205.7 people per square mile (2,002.9/km2).  There were 2,747 housing units at an average density of 2,170.6 per square mile (835.1/km2).  The racial makeup of the borough was 95.60% White, 1.18% African American, 0.33% Native American, 0.59% Asian, 0.02% Pacific Islander, 1.08% from other races, and 1.20% from two or more races. Hispanic or Latino of any race were 3.54% of the population.

There were 2,616 households, out of which 33.6% had children under the age of 18 living with them, 49.5% were married couples living together, 12.1% had a female householder with no husband present, and 33.1% were non-families. 27.6% of all households were made up of individuals, and 10.8% had someone living alone who was 65 years of age or older.  The average household size was 2.50 and the average family size was 3.04.

In the borough, the age distribution of the population shows 25.0% under the age of 18, 7.7% from 18 to 24, 32.1% from 25 to 44, 22.3% from 45 to 64, and 12.9% who were 65 years of age or older.  The median age was 36 years. For every 100 females there were 94.1 males.  For every 100 females age 18 and over, there were 91.1 males. The median income for a household in the borough was $42,432, and the median income for a family was $48,589. Males had a median income of $32,320 versus $45,730 for females. The per capita income for the borough was $18,906.  About 5.4% of families and 8.0% of the population were below the poverty line, including 11.7% of those under age 18 and 11.2% of those age 65 or over.

History
George Taylor, signer of the Declaration of Independence, built a Georgian stone house in 1768 in what is now the borough of Catasauqua. The George Taylor House has been named a National Historic Landmark, a showpiece of the community's rich historical heritage.

In 1840, the anthracite iron industry was founded in what is now known as Catasauqua, originally Biery's Port, making it a birthplace of the Industrial Revolution in the United States.
Welsh immigrant David Thomas relocated to the area and opened the Crane Iron Works.  Remembered as "the father of Catasauqua," Thomas initially named the community Craneville after his former employer in Wales. The wealthy, generous Thomases were responsible for many sweeping changes to the prosperity of the community. David Thomas founded the Presbyterian Church of Catasauqua, in which residents still worship today, and his wife Elizabeth donated money and land to found the Welsh Congregational Church, which no longer exists. Thomas organized Catasauqua's first fire company, installed its first public water system, and served as its first burgess.

In 1854, the town was formally titled Catasauqua (pronounced "Cat-uh-SAW-kwuh"), from the Lenni Lenape language, meaning "dry ground" or "thirsty ground." By 1900, Catasauqua boasted 5,000 residents, and had the highest percentage of self-made millionaires of any town in the United States. In 1917, while many of the young men of the town served in World War I, Catasauqua became the first community in the United States to raise $1 million in war bonds, earning it the nickname "The Million Dollar Town".

Catasauqua observed its 150th anniversary of incorporation in 2004. In July 2014, the town also celebrated its 100th anniversary of the old home week celebration in 1914. The original old home week marked the 75th anniversary of the town's Lehigh Crane Iron Company. Catasauqua is home to two different neighborhoods listed on the National Register of Historic Places.  One is Biery's Port, located along the Lehigh River and named for an early family of prominence. The other is known as "the mansion district," and comprises Victorian homes once owned by wealthy residents.

Public education
Catasauqua is served by the Catasauqua Area School District and maintains three public schools: Sheckler Elementary (grades k-4), Catasauqua Middle School (grades 5-8), and Catasauqua High School (grades 9-12). The district also serves parts of Hanover Township and North Catasauqua.

Transportation

No numbered highways pass through Catasauqua. The main thoroughfares through the borough include Race Street, Lehigh Street and Howerton Road.

Notable people
 Buck Freeman, former professional baseball player, Boston Americans, Boston Beaneaters, and Washington Senators
 Pat Kelly, former professional baseball player, New York Yankees, St. Louis Cardinals and Toronto Blue Jays
 Bert Kuczynski, former professional baseball player for Philadelphia Athletics and former professional football player for Detroit Lions and Philadelphia Eagles
 Jonathan Linton, former professional football player, Buffalo Bills
 Thomas Lynch, World War II P-38 fighter pilot and Quadruple Ace of the 39th Fighter Squadron, 35th Fighter Group
 Larry Miller, former professional basketball player for Carolina Cougars, Los Angeles Stars, San Diego Conquistadors, Utah Stars and Virginia Squires 
 Anthony Recker, former professional baseball player, Atlanta Braves, Chicago Cubs, New York Mets, and Oakland Athletics

References

Further reading
Catasauqua and North Catasauqua (a book on Catasauqua, Pennsylvania).

External links

Borough website
Company F, 47th Regiment, Pennsylvania Volunteer Infantry (a Civil War regiment formed in Catasauqua)
Historic Catasauqua Preservation Association 

1768 establishments in Pennsylvania
Boroughs in Lehigh County, Pennsylvania
Boroughs in Pennsylvania
Populated places established in 1768